Prashanth Siddi is an Indian actor who works in Kannada-language films. As of August 2020, he has appeared in seventy films.

Career 
Coming from a lower income background, Prashanth Siddi was selected by Chidambar Rao Jambe to work in the theatre group Ninasam. He made his film debut with Paramathma in a supporting role. He played minor roles in several films including Drishya and Lucia before playing a cheater in Duniya Soori's Kendasampige. He was signed to play the lead roles in Pantru and Vyapthi Pradeshada Horagiddare, both of which are yet to release. He also was to play the lead role in Soori's Kaage Bangaara; however, the project was later dropped.

Personal life 
Prashanth Siddi is of Siddi descent.

Filmography 

Paramathma (2011)
Anna Bond (2012)
Lucia (2013)
Chandralekha (2014)
Gajakesari (2014)
Drishya (2014)
Vaastu Prakaara (2015)
Bullet Basya (2015)
RX Soori (2015)
Kendasampige (2015)
Plus (2015)
Luv U Alia (2016)
Kalpana 2 (2016)
Santheyalli Nintha Kabira (2016)
Happy Birthday (2016)
Prema Geema Jaane Do (2016)
Doddmane Hudga (2016)
Jaguar (2016; also in Telugu)
John Jani Janardhan (2016)
Sojiga (2016)
Trigger (2017)
Beautiful Manasugalu (2017)
First Love (2017)
College Kumar (2017)
Womens Day (2017)
O Premave (2018)
Bhootayyana Mommaga Ayyu (2018)
A + (2018)
Paradesi C/o London (2018)
Kaddu Mucchi (2019)
Gara (2019)
Gentleman (2020)
Popcorn Monkey Tiger (2020)
Mugilpete (2021)
 Ombattane Dikku  (2022) as Chintaka

References

External links 
 

Living people
Indian film actors
Actors in Kannada cinema
21st-century Indian actors
Male actors in Kannada cinema
Male actors in Kannada theatre
Indian people of Kenyan descent
Year of birth missing (living people)
Siddhi people